William Andrew McQuade (born 27 August 1959) is a Scottish former footballer, who played for Hamilton Academical, Dumbarton and Albion Rovers.

References

1959 births
Scottish footballers
Dumbarton F.C. players
Hamilton Academical F.C. players
Albion Rovers F.C. players
Scottish Football League players
Living people
People from Johnstone
Association football midfielders
Blantyre Victoria F.C. players
Pollok F.C. players